Horatio Mosley Moule  (1832–1873) was the fourth son of Anglican priest and inventor Henry Moule, and is best remembered as a friend of Thomas Hardy. He was generally known as Horace, to distinguish him from his Uncle Horatio, after whom he was named.

Early life
Moule was born on 30 May 1832 at Fordington, Dorset, where his father was vicar. In 1851 he entered Trinity College, Oxford, but left without a degree; in 1854 he entered Queens' College, Cambridge, but did not get a B.A. until 1867 and an M.A. in 1873. He did, however, win the Hulsean Prize in 1858.

Career
He spent a brief spell as an assistant master at Marlborough College, and then became a government inspector of workhouses.

Personal life
Moule appears to have suffered from depression and alcoholism, and his life and death were shaped by these character traits; one of his pupils recorded in his diary that Horace was "a dipsomaniac-and that he was suffering from D.T".

Death
On 21 September 1873, when deeply depressed and affected by alcohol, he ended a three-hour conversation at Queens' with his brother Charles and went to bed. Minutes later Charles, writing in an adjoining room, heard what he described as a "trickling" sound and went to investigate. He found Horace covered in blood but conscious and able to utter his last words "Easy to die. Love to my mother", having slashed his throat with the razor that he kept under his pillow for that very purpose. The inquest jury returned a verdict of suicide whilst temporarily insane, and he was buried at Fordington.

Hardy
Some of Hardy's poems were dedicated to Moule, and it has been suggested that several characters and scenes in his novels were inspired by him. Henry Knight in A Pair of Blue Eyes shares many of Moule's character traits.

References

External links
The influence of Moule on Thomas Hardy

Alumni of Trinity College, Oxford
Alumni of Queens' College, Cambridge
1832 births
1873 deaths
Suicides by sharp instrument in England